Judicial Error (French: Erreur judiciaire) is a 1948 French drama film directed by Maurice de Canonge and starring Michèle Alfa, Jimmy Gaillard and Lucienne Le Marchand.

The film's sets were designed by the art director Raymond Gabutti.

Synopsis
After a banker is driven to suicide by his wife's reckless spending, an innocent cashier is wrongly implicated in a crime.

Cast
Michèle Alfa as Janine Heurteaux
Jimmy Gaillard as Bob Richard
Lucienne Le Marchand as Suzanne Gauthier-Duvergne
Jean Davy as Me Lenoir
Marcel Dalio as Dinari
Robert le Béal as Gauthier-Duvergne
Nicolas Amato as the money changer
Yves Brainville as Jacques Heurteaux
Jean-Jacques Delbo as Stefano
Agnès Laury as "Hen"
Robert Seller as Monsieur de Berville
Jacques Berlioz as the prosecutor
Géno Ferny as Joseph
Jacques Henley as American
Gaston Dupray as manager of the café
Jérôme Goulven as the Commissioner
Pierre Magnier as the President of the tribunal
Jacques Mattler as the Advocate General

References

External links

1948 drama films
French drama films
Films directed by Maurice de Canonge
1940s French-language films
1940s French films